Brian L. Ellis (born 1969) is a former member of the Pennsylvania House of Representatives, who represented the 11th House district in Butler County. He served as Chairman of the House Consumer Affairs Committee until 2019.

Personal
Born in 1969 in Butler, Pennsylvania, Ellis graduated from Butler Senior High School and graduated from the University of Pittsburgh with a degree in communications. Prior to his election, he worked for his family's automobile dealership in Western Pennsylvania.

Political career
Ellis first won a seat in the House in 2004, finishing first in a three-way Republican Party (United States) primary and going on to defeat Democrat Fred Vero with 55.9% of the vote.

In 2006, he defeated a challenger in the Republican primary with 78% of the vote and won the general election over Democrat Bill Neel with over 64% of the vote.

Ellis was unopposed in the 2008 primary and was opposed in the general election by Democrat Dave Wilson. He was re-elected in the 2010 general election.

Ellis has served as the Pennsylvania State Leader for the American Legislative Exchange Council (ALEC).

Accusations and Resignation 
In January 2019, the Dauphin County District Attorney's Office opened a criminal investigation into allegations Ellis had raped a female state employee while she was incapacitated, prompting members of the Pennsylvania state house, including the Republican leadership, to call for his resignation. The victim later issued a complaint to the Pennsylvania House Ethics Committee detailing the alleged assault. Ellis, who was married at the time, denied the accusations, but leading Republicans began to call for a full investigation. He resigned on March 18, 2019, six days after the complaint was issued.

In August 2019, Dauphin County District Attorney Fran Chardo declined to charge Ellis.

References

External links

Living people
University of Pittsburgh alumni
People from Butler County, Pennsylvania
Republican Party members of the Pennsylvania House of Representatives
21st-century American politicians
1969 births
State and local political sex scandals in the United States